Simtuzumab (INN; formerly GS 6624) is a humanized monoclonal antibody designed for the treatment of fibrosis. It binds to LOXL2 and acts as an immunomodulator. In January 2016,  Gilead Sciences terminated its Phase 2 clinical study in patients with idiopathic pulmonary fibrosis (IPF) due to lack of efficacy.

References 

Monoclonal antibodies